Miruhulee boava is a Maldivian delicacy made of octopus tentacles braised in curry leaves, chili, garlic, cloves, onion, pepper, and coconut oil.

See also
 List of seafood dishes

References

Maldivian curries
Octopus dishes